Mecistogaster amazonica is a species of narrow-winged damselfly in the family Coenagrionidae.

References

Further reading

 

Coenagrionidae
Articles created by Qbugbot
Insects described in 1918